Amaranthus anderssonii is a species of plant in the family Amaranthaceae. It is endemic to Ecuador.

References

Endemic flora of Ecuador
anderssonii
Taxonomy articles created by Polbot
Plants described in 1933